Phaio aurata is a moth of the subfamily Arctiinae. It was described by Schaus in 1892. It is found in Peru.

References

Arctiinae
Moths described in 1892